Route 162 is a state highway in southern Connecticut running for  from Milford to the West Haven–Orange town line. Because it is located along the Atlantic coast it serves as a more scenic alternate route to US 1, where it both begins and ends.

Route description
The western terminus of Route 162 is in Milford, where its name is South Broad Street, and from which it tracks east. After passing through downtown Milford, the name changes to New Haven Avenue. Just northeast of the West Haven town line, it becomes Jones Hill Road. A little over two miles (3 km) farther to the northeast, it becomes Platt Avenue. Less than a mile farther, it becomes Main Street for just . Following Main Street northeast, a driver would then have to turn left onto Wagner Place in order to remain on Route 162. Wagner Place becomes Sawmill Road, which curves left and backtracks to the southwest, meeting I-95 at exit 42. Bull Hill Lane continues to the northwest, crossing the Orange town line and ending at US 1 after less than a mile.

History
Route 162 was created in the 1932 state highway renumbering as a five-mile (8 km) road from Route 1 near the Orange-West Haven line to the junction between Jones Hill Road and Ocean Avenue near the Milford-West Haven line. The portion in Milford was originally numbered as part of Route 122. This segment was removed from Route 122 and reassigned to an extended Route 162 in 1966.

Junction list

References

External links

162
Transportation in New Haven County, Connecticut